Wale Omotoso (born May 6, 1985) is a Nigerian professional boxer. He was based in Australia for several years, where he turned professional.  In 2011, he signed with Top Rank, and was trained and managed by Freddie Roach at Wild Card Boxing in Los Angeles, California.

After a successful 15-year career, Omotoso, who had suffered two past concussions, and who wanted to ensure his ability to continue supporting his wife and two sons, retired from fighting, and became a trainer at Wild Card.

Early life
He is one of five children whose mother died when he was young, and whose father did the best he could, until he, too, died in the 2000s decade. Wale learned to fight on the streets of one of Africa's most populous cities, Lagos. He calls himself "Lucky Boy", because he is lucky to be alive, let alone to have parlayed his natural ability into a ticket from the mean streets of Lagos to the clean streets of Blackburn, Victoria, a suburb of Melbourne, Australia. As children, he and his brothers had to run with a street gang. He's seen people shot, bashed, and slashed with machetes. He learned to run in zigzag fashion to avoid bullets.  Six days a week, the "street boys" preyed on shopkeepers, passers-by, and weaker gangs.

Amateur career
Omotoso had a reported 48 amateur fights, with only one loss. He was an all-African champion, and one of his toughest fights was with King Davison.

Professional career

Welterweight
In November 2010, in Victoria, Australia, Wale was originally slated to face Muhammad Abdullaev, but ended up facing Argentine journeyman Juan Alberto Godoy.  After knocking down Godoy in the fourth round, Godoy's corner threw in the towel as the referee was restarting the action, as Godoy was clearly still on shaky legs.

Training career
In 2022, AB Ayad, a creative-staff member of the H3 Podcast with no boxing (or other competitive athletic) experience, to prepare for his fight in the Creator Clash event organized by YouTuber iDubbbz, asked for the toughest coach at Wild Card, and was paired up with Omotoso. Ayad noted that he soon realized he may have underestimated what "toughest coach" would mean. Fearing for AB's safety, Omotoso initially tried to talk him out of participating in the Clash, but when Ayad persisted, Omotoso adjusted his teaching techniques to allow for a rank amateur. Although AB lost to his stalwart opponent in the fifth and final round via TKO, the Omotoso–Ayad training relationship was considered a success by both parties.

Professional boxing record

| style="text-align:center;" colspan="8"|28 Wins (22 Knockouts), 5 Losses, 0 Draws, 1 No Contest 
|-  style="text-align:center; background:#e3e3e3;"
|  style="border-style:none none solid solid; "|Res.
|  style="border-style:none none solid solid; "|Record
|  style="border-style:none none solid solid; "|Opponent
|  style="border-style:none none solid solid; "|Type
|  style="border-style:none none solid solid; "|Rd., Time
|  style="border-style:none none solid solid; "|Date
|  style="border-style:none none solid solid; "|Location
|  style="border-style:none none solid solid; "|Notes
|- align=center
|Win
|align=center|28–4 (1)||align=left| Curtis Stevens
|
|
|
|align=left|
|align=left|
|- align=center
|Loss
|align=center|27–4 (1)||align=left| Chordale Booker
|
|
|
|align=left|
|align=left|
|- align=center
|Win
|align=center|27–3 (1)||align=left| Freddy Hernandez
|
|
|
|align=left|
|align=left|
|- align=center
|Loss
|align=center|26–3 (1)||align=left| Jamal James
|
|
|
|align=left|
|align=left|
|- align=center
|Win
|align=center|26–2 (1)||align=left| Gilberto Sanchez Leon
|
|
|
|align=left|
|align=left|
|- align=center
|Loss
|align=center|25–2 (1)||align=left| Sammy Vasquez
|
|
|
|align=left|
|align=left|
|- align=center
|Win
|align=center|25–1 (1)||align=left| Abraham Alvarez
|
|
|
|align=left|
|align=left|
|- align=center
|Win
|align=center|24–1 (1)||align=left| Eduardo Flores
|
|
|
|align=left|
|align=left|
|- align=center
|Loss
|align=center|23–1 (1)||align=left| Jessie Vargas
|
|
|
|align=left|
|align=left|
|- align=center
|style="background:#ddd;"|NC
|align=center|23–0 (1)||align=left| Irving Garcia
|
|
|
|align=left|
|align=left|
|- align=center
|Win
|align=center|23–0||align=left| Daniel Sostre
|
|
|
|align=left|
|align=left|
|- align=center
|Win
|align=center|22–0||align=left| Larry Smith
|
|
|
|align=left|
|align=left|
|- align=center
|Win
|align=center|21–0||align=left| Nestor Rosas
|
|
|
|align=left|
|align=left|
|- align=center
|Win
|align=center|20–0||align=left| Lanardo Tyner
|
|
|
|align=left|
|align=left|
|- align=center
|Win
|align=center|19–0||align=left| Calvin Odom
|
|
|
|align=left|
|align=left|
|- align=center
|Win
|align=center|18–0||align=left| Juan Alberto Godoy
|
|
|
|align=left|
|align=left|
|- align=center
|Win
|align=center|17–0||align=left| Kiatchai Singwancha
|
|
|
|align=left|
|align=left|
|- align=center
|Win
|align=center|16–0||align=left| Ray Musson
|
|
|
|align=left|
|align=left|
|- align=center
|Win
|align=center|15–0||align=left| Hwan-Young Park
|
|
|
|align=left|
|align=left|
|- align=center
|Win
|align=center|14–0||align=left| Emanuel Augustus
|
|
|
|align=left|
|align=left|
|- align=center
|Win
|align=center|13–0||align=left| Darsim Nanggala
|
|
|
|align=left|
|align=left|
|- align=center
|Win
|align=center|12–0||align=left| Jamed Jalarante
|
|
|
|align=left|
|align=left|
|- align=center
|Win
|align=center|11–0||align=left| Aswin Cabuy
|
|
|
|align=left|
|align=left|
|- align=center
|Win
|align=center|10–0||align=left| Napparat Patanakan Gym	
|
|
|
|align=left|
|align=left|
|- align=center
|Win
|align=center|9–0||align=left| Samuel Colomban	
|
|
|
|align=left|
|align=left|
|- align=center
|Win
|align=center|8–0||align=left| Tia Koswara
|
|
|
|align=left|
|align=left|
|- align=center
|Win
|align=center|7–0||align=left| Komsak Sithkrupon
|
|
|
|align=left|
|align=left|
|- align=center
|Win
|align=center|6–0||align=left| Glen Masicampo
|
|
|
|align=left|
|align=left|
|- align=center
|Win
|align=center|5–0||align=left| Somchai Nakbalee
|
|
|
|align=left|
|align=left|
|- align=center
|Win
|align=center|4–0||align=left| Jakkirt Suwunnalirt
|
|
|
|align=left|
|align=left|
|- align=center
|Win
|align=center|3–0||align=left| Kongthawat Sorkitti
|
|
|
|align=left|
|align=left|
|- align=center
|Win
|align=center|2–0||align=left| Ariel Omongos
|
|
|
|align=left|
|align=left|
|- align=center
|Win
|align=center|1–0||align=left| Singyok Sor Seesunt
|
|
|
|align=left|
|align=left|
|- align=center

Titles in boxing
Major Sanctioning Bodies:
–

Minor Sanctioning Bodies:
 IBF Pan Pacific Welterweight Champion (147 lbs)
 IBF Pan Pacific Youth Welterweight Champion (147 lbs)

References

External links
 

1985 births
American male boxers
American people of Yoruba descent
Living people
Nigerian emigrants to the United States
Nigerian male boxers
Place of birth missing (living people)
Welterweight boxers
Yoruba sportspeople
Sportspeople from Lagos
Nigerian expatriate sportspeople in Australia
People from Blackburn, Victoria
Boxing trainers